The 2003 Hull City Council election took place on 1 May 2003 to elect members of Hull City Council in England. One third of the council was up for election and the council stayed under no overall control.

The council had fallen from Labour control in the 2002 election after the Liberal Democrats made big gains. The 2003 election saw controversy over a proposal to demolish 2,500 council houses in Hull, which had seen some Liberal Democrat cabinet members sacked and other councillors leave the party. The results saw Labour make 4 gains to become the largest party on the council once again, which enabled them to form the administration on the council.

After the election, the composition of the council was
Labour 28
Liberal Democrat 21
Independent 8
Conservative 2

Election result

Ward results

No elections were held in Bricknell, Southcoates East, Southcoates West and St Andrews wards.

References

2003
2003 English local elections
2000s in Kingston upon Hull